Esker is an unincorporated community in Portage County, Wisconsin, United States.

Geography

Esker (pronounced EEE-skir) is located in central Wisconsin approximately four miles east of Stevens Point on U.S. Highway 10 near Portage County Road K (to the north).  Esker is less than a mile northeast of Custer in the town of Stockton (Lat: 44° 31' 15.3" Lon: -89° 26' 04.4").

History
Esker was once a budding settlement to the north of Custer, boasting the St. Mary's Parish and surrounding subdivisions up on the hill.  Today, after the restructuring of U.S. Highway 10 into a four-lane freeway and ramp-interchange with County Road J, Esker is split: "Custer Square" only has access out to County Road J on its west side while Esker Road, Summit Lane, and Lloyd Court are only accessible via County Road K to the east. Many have considered Esker to be a general part of the unincorporated community of Custer, which is downhill and closer to the railroad tracks.

Notes

Unincorporated communities in Wisconsin
Unincorporated communities in Portage County, Wisconsin